Ernest Borgnine on the Bus is a 1997 video documentary short featuring Ernest Borgnine.  It chronicles Borgnine on his 1996 road trip in his bus across the United States to greet his fans.  The documentary was directed by Jeff Krulik.

Reception
Erin Richter of Entertainment Weekly graded the film a B.

References

External links
 
 

1990s short documentary films
American short documentary films
1997 films
1990s English-language films
1990s American films